Rémuzat (Vivaro-Alpine: Remusat) is a commune in the Drôme department in southeastern France.

Population

Sights
 The Rocher du Caire, a large cliff inhabited by griffon vultures.

See also
Communes of the Drôme department

References

Communes of Drôme